The University Medical Center Hamburg-Eppendorf is the teaching hospital of the University of Hamburg and the largest hospital in Hamburg, Germany.

The UKE has 1,738 beds and 121 day-care places and is listed to provide the capacity to dispatch emergency medical services.

History

The first parts of the hospital were built between 1884 and 1889. From 1913 until 1926, Fritz Schumacher built a general purpose building, today called Fritz-Schumacher-Haus, among others for the pathological anatomy with a dissecting room. In 2008 the hospital participated in the Tag des offenen Denkmals, a Germany-wide annual event sponsored by the Deutsche Stiftung Denkmalschutz, that opens cultural heritage sites to the public—showing the Fritz-Schumacher-Haus and the operating theatre in a bunker from World War II.

In 2011, the hospital achieved Stage 7 of the Healthcare Information and Management Systems Society Analytics Europe's Electronic Medical Record Adoption Model. This was awarded for achieving a paperless medical record environment coupled with significant computerised analysis of clinical data.

Location

The hospital is located in Eppendorf, Hamburg, between Martinistraße and Geschwister-Scholl-Straße, and between the ground of SC Victoria in Hoheluft and the Krankenhaus Bethanien, a hospital which was built in 1893.

Board
The board consists of Burkhard Göke, Medical Director and acting CEO, Marya Verdel, Financial Director, Joachim Prölß, Director of patients and care management and the Dean of the Faculty of Medicine Blanche Schwappach-Pignataro.

See also
 Heinrich Pette Institute
 Center for Molecular Neurobiology Hamburg
 Bernhard Nocht Institute for Tropical Medicine
 Education in Hamburg

Notes

References
 Hospitals in Hamburg 2012, Government Agency for Health and Consumer Protection of Hamburg website

External links

 University of Hamburg website
 UKE website
 International office of the UKE website
 UKE at Healthcare Hamburg

Medical Centre
Universities and colleges in Hamburg
Buildings and structures in Hamburg-Nord
Hospitals established in 1889
1889 establishments in Germany
Hamburg
Medical and health organisations based in Hamburg